The D'Entrecasteaux Channel  is a body of water located between Bruny Island and the south-east of the mainland of Tasmania, Australia. The channel is the mouth for the estuaries of the Derwent and the Huon Rivers and empties into the Tasman Sea of the South Pacific Ocean. It was sighted by Abel Tasman in 1642 and surveyed in 1792 by Bruni d'Entrecasteaux.

Towns on the D'Entrecasteaux Channel include Snug, Margate, Kettering, Woodbridge, Flowerpot, Middleton and Gordon.

History
The area has always been of great significance to the Nuenonne band of the South East tribe of Tasmanian Indigenous peoples. According to The Mercury newspaper, the channel "..... was discovered on April 20, 1792, by the celebrated French "Vice-Admiral Bruni D'Entrecasteaux, who, in the ships Recherche and Esperance, was searching for ill-fated La Perouse. Visiting Van Diemen's Land for the first time, he was attempting to find an anchorage in Adventure Bay, when, being himself ill in bed, the ships' navigators entered the channel to the west of Bruny Island, instead of going to the eastward of it. Thus, the discovery of the great channel was due to an accident. This is Labillardiere's account of the matter. A wrong bearing taken of the Mewstone accounts for the French navigator's error."

Whaling stations operated on the shores of the channel in the first half of the 19th century.

Geography and environment
The D'Entrecasteaux Channel region sheltered by Bruny Island is increasingly affected by foreshore erosion, in some areas sandbagging aims to reduce the effects.

The channel is a breeding ground for scallops. Prior to 1969, fishing dredges were used to collect scallops from the seafloor. Damage caused by the dredging has led to collection by scuba divers.

The D'Entrecasteaux Channel has become a popular location for keen photographers to capture images of the aurora australis with its numerous southern-facing water views and beaches, although light pollution from the numerous salmon farms is now starting to impact on this visual beauty from many locations.

Gallery

See also

Protected areas of Tasmania

References

External links

Southern Tasmania
Channels of Australia
Bruny Island
Whaling stations in Australia